This is a list of the areas in England and Wales that became rural districts when the Local Government Act 1894 came into force from December 1894.

1894
Initially 690 rural districts were created under the Local Government Act 1894.

In the table:
'UD' stands for Urban District
'RD' stands for Rural District
'MB' stands for Municipal Borough
'CB' stands for County Borough

1895-1929
In the period 1895-1929 only two rural districts were formed, while forty-six were abolished, a net decrease of 44, bringing the total number of rural districts to 646.

1930-39
In the 1930s sixty-two rural districts were formed and two hundred thirty-one abolished, a net decrease of 169, bringing the total number of rural districts to 477. This was largely due to the County review orders instigated by the Local Government Act 1929.

1940-74
From 1940 until their abolition in 1974, there were only six more rural districts formed and a further thirteen abolished, a net decrease of 7, bringing the total number of rural districts to 470.

Sources

 
 
 
 
England geography-related lists
rural
Former subdivisions of England
Local government in the United Kingdom
Rural districts of England
Rural districts of Wales
Rural districts of the United Kingdom
Wales geography-related lists
History of local government in England